Barry Neil Passfield  (1932–1985) was an Australian rugby league footballer who played in the 1950s.

Passfield was graded from the St. George Presidents Cup team from 1951. He played two seasons with the Dragons between 1952 and 1953.

Barry Passfield played in the 1953 Grand Final loss to South Sydney.

Death

Passfield died on 27 May 1985, aged 53.

References

St. George Dragons players
Australian rugby league players
1985 deaths
1932 births
Rugby league second-rows
Date of birth missing
Place of birth missing